Noel Michael Prefontaine (born December 23, 1973) is a former professional Canadian football punter and placekicker in the Canadian Football League (CFL).

Early years 
Prefontaine was born to a French Canadian father and a Vietnamese mother at the Marine Corps Base Camp Pendleton in California. His father was born and raised in Verdun, Quebec and Noel lived with his grandmother in Verdun as a child, which enables him to be considered a non-import for CFL purposes. He returned to the United States and attended El Camino High School in San Diego County, California.

Prefontaine played baseball, soccer, and played offensive tackle in American football as a child and continually trained himself to improve as an athlete and at high school, he played quarterback as well as punting and placekicking. He was named San Diego Tribune Athlete of the Year for North County as a senior and led El Camino High School to a 22–2 record and a CIF Championship as their starting quarterback.

Prefontaine hoped to play quarterback in college football but could only obtain a scholarship as a punter at California State University, Fullerton. His punting average his first year led the state but the football program folded at the end of the season.  Prefontaine received offers to play for multiple college football teams including Michigan, Michigan State, Georgia, LSU, and Texas but chose to go to Arizona State University because it was close to his family and friends. He was unhappy there, however, and left to go to San Diego State University. After a required redshirt year because of his transfer, he was named All-Conference as a punter in his junior year and first-team All-American as a punter in his senior year.

Professional career

XFL
In 2001, Prefontaine also played in the XFL with the Los Angeles Xtreme as their punter. He was officially listed as the team's third-string quarterback (behind Tommy Maddox and Scott Milanovich, the latter of whom would eventually become Prefontaine's coach in Toronto) in order to collect a higher salary and because the XFL did not reserve separate roster spots for punters (on the other XFL teams, placekickers doubled as punters). He went on to play in the one and only XFL championship game on April 21, 2001, with the Xtreme, with his team ultimately winning the championship.

CFL
Prefontaine began his CFL career in 1998 with the Toronto Argonauts and spent the next ten seasons with them before getting traded to the Edmonton Eskimos on May 31, 2008, for a first round pick in the 2009 CFL Draft and a conditional draft pick in 2010. On October 12, 2010, Prefontaine was traded back to the Argonauts in exchange for defensive tackle Étienne Légaré and the negotiation rights to defensive back Damaso Munoz.  On February 12, 2014, Prefontaine was released by the Argonauts. In his CFL career Prefontaine won the Grey Cup twice, both with the Argonauts, in 2004 and 2012. On August 14, 2014, Prefontaine announced that he will sign a 1-day contract with the Toronto Argonauts on August 17, with the purpose of retiring as an Argonaut. The decision to retire as an Argonaut came despite initial remarks he made in 2008 shortly following his trade to the Eskimos team that he had no desire to retire as an Argonaut, citing bitterness he had toward the organization concerning the trade.

References

External links 
 Pro Football Archives stats
 Official Stats and bio at CFL.ca
 Toronto Argonauts bio
 One on one with Noel Prefontaine (Slam.ca article)

1973 births
Living people
American emigrants to Canada
American football placekickers
American football punters
American people of Québécois descent
American players of Canadian football
American sportspeople of Vietnamese descent
Canadian football placekickers
Canadian football punters
Canadian people of Vietnamese descent
Canadian sportspeople of Vietnamese descent
Edmonton Elks players
Los Angeles Xtreme players
People from Verdun, Quebec
Players of Canadian football from Quebec
Players of Canadian football from San Diego
San Diego State Aztecs football players
Toronto Argonauts players